The 2016 Stanford Cardinal football team represented Stanford University in the 2016 NCAA Division I FBS football season. The Cardinal were led by sixth-year head coach David Shaw. They played their home games at Stanford Stadium and were members of the North Division of the Pac-12 Conference. They finished the season 10–3, 6–3 in Pac-12 play to finish in third place in the North Division. They were invited to the Sun Bowl where they defeated North Carolina.

Previous season

In 2015, the Cardinal were the champions of the Pac-12 for the third time in four years, defeating Iowa 45–16 in the Rose Bowl.

Stanford finished the season ranked #3 in the final Coaches Poll, their highest final ranking in the history of that poll. They were similarly ranked #3 in the final AP Poll, their highest final ranking in 75 years, following the 1940 national championship season.

Personnel

Coaching staff

Roster

Schedule

Game summaries

Kansas State

USC

at UCLA

at No. 10 Washington

Washington State

at Notre Dame

Colorado

at Arizona

Oregon State

at Oregon

at California

Rice

vs. North Carolina–Sun Bowl

Rankings

Players drafted into the NFL

References

Stanford
Stanford Cardinal football seasons
Sun Bowl champion seasons
Stanford Cardinal football